Weizenbaum is a German surname. Notable people with the surname include:

Joseph Weizenbaum (1923–2008), German-American computer scientist
Zoe Weizenbaum (born 1991), American actress

See also
Weidenbaum

German-language surnames